Bromine monofluoride is a quite unstable interhalogen compound with the chemical formula BrF. It can be produced through the reaction of bromine trifluoride (or bromine pentafluoride) and bromine. Due to its lability, the compound can be detected but not isolated:

BrF3 + Br2 → 3 BrF
BrF5 + 2 Br2 → 5 BrF
Br2(l) + F2(g) → 2 BrF(g)
It is usually generated in the presence of cesium fluoride.

Bromine monofluoride decomposes at normal temperature through dismutation to bromine trifluoride, bromine pentafluoride, and free bromine.

See also 
 Bromine trifluoride, BrF3
 Bromine pentafluoride, BrF5

References 

Fluorides
Bromine(I) compounds
Interhalogen compounds
Diatomic molecules